The Premios 40 Principales for Best Colombian Act is an honor that was presented annually at Los Premios 40 Principales between 2007 and 2011. It was discontinued due to the creation of Los Premios 40 Principales América, as part of which it reemerged in 2014.

References

2011 music awards